Mungallala South is a rural locality in the Maranoa Region, Queensland, Australia.

Mungallala South's postcode is 4467.

History 
The name Mungallala comes from the town and pastoral run name. It is derived from the Kunggari language, from mungar/kungar meaning bird and yaya/lala meaning shout, describing the sound of the claws of running emu.

Education 
There are no schools in Mungallala South. The nearest primary school is in neighbouring Mungallala. The nearest secondary school is in Mitchell but only offers up to Year 10. For Years 11 and 12, the nearest secondary schools are in Roma and Charleville.

References 

Maranoa Region
Localities in Queensland